The house of Sheikh Saeed bin Hamad Al Qasimi built by the ruler of Kalba Saeed bin Hamad Al Qasimi served as the administrative center for the Emirate of Kalba and its subordinate areas from 1903 until 1937.

History 
In the city of Kalba, Sheikh Saeed bin Hamad Al Qasimi's home, constructed between 1898 and 1901, is situated directly across from the historical fort. The house looks out onto the sea, which over time, has absorbed the patterns and manifestations of the people's commercial and economic life in the city. It is ancient and deeply ingrained in civilization and urbanization. More than a century ago, Sheikh Saeed Al-Qasimi occupied this home as his residence and place to take care of matters of governance. The gross area of the house from the inside is 3367 square meters, while its perimeter reaches 6049 square meters.

Museum history 
A comprehensive restoration of the house took place under the directives of Sheik Dr. Sultan bin Muhammad Al Qasimi, member of the Supreme Council and Ruler of the Emirate of Sharjah. Since it is considered one of the most important tourist destinations that affect the area. The restoration process consisted of two stages that started in 1993. On December 5th, 1999, the house, equipped with the latest technical means, was officially opened to the public. Additionally, His Highness commanded that it be converted into a museum to be a part of the collection of magnificent museums widespread in the Arab Capital of Culture.The house consists of seventeen rooms, three chambers, a spacious yard, and an official visitors' reception room, in which Sheik Saeed Al Qasimi concluded numerous significant treaties and agreements with the British during their occupation of the region.

The home reportedly had a library, a stable for horses, a barn for camels and cattle. There are also two entrances—the main entrance and a secondary entrance.The house's architecture consists of a single story, with one room on the upper floor designated by the Sheikh for guest lodging. In the inner yard, there are two suites, each containing several rooms, a chamber, a kitchen, a nursery, and a bedroom for Sheikh Saeed connected with a small storage for his items and personal belongings. Next to this room is another room for his personalized weapons. The Islamic Heritage Rooms are a few of these rooms that have been set aside for showcasing Islamic holdings. One of them is a copy of the Holy Qur'an written in 256 AH using Kashmiri script and black ink. Red ink got used for the titles of the chapters, and gold water for the chapter's spacers. The room also includes the “Manuscript of the Smart Jewels in Solving the Ashmawiya Words.” by Ahmed bin Turki bin Ahmed Al-Maliki. It was written by Al Mamluk Jawhar bin Al-Mamlouk Yaqut, a subordinate of Khamis Al Bu Ainin in 1261 AH. Two letters written by the Prophet Muhammad, peace be upon him, are also kept in the room. In them, he advises Al-Muqawqis, the foremost Copt in Egypt, and Al-Mundhir bin Sawi to either convert to Islam or pay tribute. A copy of the Holy Qur'an, written nearly 700 years ago, is also incorporated in the room. In another room, there are gold, copper, and silver coins from the Umayyad and Abbasid eras, in addition to Yemini, Sasanian, and Byzantine coins, which the Arabs used in foreign trade. Money from the Abbasid era is on display in the museum, including the dinar, which has kept its size, weight, and shape while bearing the names of cities, governors, crown princes, ministers, and numismatics supervisors. The Umayyad dinar is on the view in the house. The phrase “There is no God but Allah alone with no partner to Him.” is written on one side, and “He is Allah, the One and Only; Allah, the Eternal, Absolute; He begets not, nor was He begotten.” on the other side. The Antiquities Room displays rare archaeological artifacts, including bowls made of steatite stone that date to the second millennium BC.

See also 
 Kalba
 Sheikh Sultan bin Mohammed AlQasimi

References 

Emirate of Sharjah
Museums in the United Arab Emirates
Museums in Sharjah (city)